Christian Oscar Bernardi (born 10 March 1990) is an Argentine professional footballer atualmente está sem clube.

Career

Instituto
Bernardi's football senior career began in 2010 with Instituto of Primera B Nacional, he made his first-team debut on 18 August 2012 in a league match against Almirante Brown. A year previous, Bernardi had a short loan spell with Torneo Argentino A team Gimnasia y Esgrima. After returning to Instituto and making his debut, twenty-nine appearances and one goal followed for him during the 2012–13 season. On 10 May 2015, Bernardi made his 100th league appearance for the club versus Central Córdoba and scored the opening goal of the match in the process.

Colón
In July 2016, Bernardi joined Argentine Primera División side Colón. His top-flight debut came on 30 August 2016 against Aldosivi.

Career statistics
.

References

External links
 

1990 births
Living people
Footballers from Córdoba, Argentina
Argentine sportspeople of Italian descent
Argentine footballers
Association football midfielders
Primera Nacional players
Torneo Argentino A players
Argentine Primera División players
Campeonato Brasileiro Série A players
Instituto footballers
Gimnasia y Esgrima de Concepción del Uruguay footballers
Club Atlético Colón footballers
Fortaleza Esporte Clube players
Argentine expatriate footballers
Argentine expatriate sportspeople in Brazil
Expatriate footballers in Brazil